Bill Cheatham was a roadie for the band Stooges, and in 1970 joined the group on second guitar. Cheatham was a childhood friend of Ron Asheton, and was a member of the group during the time in which the band played at Ungano's Club in New York City, from which the release Have Some Fun: Live At Ungano's was taken. His tenure in the band was relatively short-lived, as he played guitar for The Stooges from August 1970 until December of the same year, when James Williamson, who was his roommate at the time, replaced him as the second guitarist. Cheatham died in the late 1990s, and left a wife and daughter.

1990s deaths
Year of birth unknown
Road crew
Guitarists from Michigan
American male guitarists